Belaya River (means "White River" in Russian) may refer to the following rivers in Russia:

 Belaya (Lake Imandra), a tributary of the Lake Imandra in the Murmansk Oblast
 Belaya (Kama), a tributary of the Kama in the Republic of Bashkortostan
 Belaya (Kuban), a tributary of the Kuban in the Republic of Adygea and in Krasnodar Krai
 Belaya (Penzhina), a tributary of the Penzhina River in Kamchatka Krai
 Belaya (Angara), a tributary of the Angara in Irkutsk Oblast
 Belaya (Chukotka), a tributary of the Anadyr in the Chukotka Autonomous Okrug
 Belaya (Yakutia), another name for the Khanda, a tributary of the Aldan

See also 
 White River (disambiguation)